Walter Stevens may refer to:
 Walter Stevens (gangster) (1877–1931), freelance enforcer and hitman during Prohibition
 Walter Stevens (trade unionist) (1904–1954),British trade unionist
 Walter H. Stevens (1827–1867), Confederate States Army general
 Walter B. Stevens (1848–1939), journalist and secretary and publicity director of the Louisiana Purchase Exposition Company